Francesco Gaetano Caltagirone (born 1943) is an Italian businessman. He controls the holding company Caltagirone S.p.A. with interests in cement manufacturing, real estate, construction and publishing (with Caltagirone Editore).

As of 2015, Caltagirone was ranked number #894 on the 2015 Forbes billionaire list and #19 in Italy, with an estimated net worth of $2.1 billion.

Biography
Francesco Gaetano Caltagirone was born in Rome into a large family composed almost entirely of manufacturers. His grandfather constructed the first buildings in Palermo in the last decades of the 1800s.

While studying at the faculty of engineering in Rome, Caltagirone and his brothers Edoardo Francesco Caltagirone and Leonardo Francesco Caltagirone resumed the family business that had been interrupted in the forties because of the sudden death of their father. With the inherited capital, the brothers started the company together with their cousin Gaetano Caltagirone, an architect already working as a manufacturer.

Francesco Gaetano Caltagirone became a partner in the company. Since then the group (today known as the Caltagirone Group or Caltagirone S.p.A.) has constructed approximately 200 real estate complexes, composed of nearly 800 buildings with a total area of close to 3.3 million square metres and a value of €15 billion.

In the seventies the equity balance between Francesco Gaetano Caltagirone and his cousin Gaetano Caltagirone was changed, and Francesco Gaetano Caltagirone became part of the majority shareholders – on an equal footing with his brother Edoardo Francesco Caltagirone.

In 1984 he took over Vianini Lavori S.p.A. – now part of the Caltagirone Group – which operates worldwide in the field of large infrastructure project. He became president of the company. After a complete industrial restructuring, he carried out the listing of the two subsidiaries, Vianini Lavori S.p.A. Industry and Vianini Industria S.p.A.

In 1992 he took over Cementir S.p.A., the fourth biggest Italian company in the cement industry, acquired by IRI (Istituto per la Ricostruzione Industriale) through a public auction. In a few years, under the guidance of his son Francesco Caltagirone Jr., Cementir S.p.A. became a multinational company with significant presence in Scandinavia, Turkey and the Far East. About 80% of the turnover is produced outside Italy.

In the mid-nineties he assumed full control of the Caltagirone Group joining his shares with those of his cousin Gaetano Caltagirone in the company Finanziaria Italia. Francesco Gaetano Caltagirone holds approximately 70% of Finanziaria Italia, which controls about 51% of Caltagirone S.p.A.

In 1996 he acquired the Roman newspaper Il Messaggero from the Montedison Group, and the following year two local newspapers from private investors: Il Mattino based in Naples and Il Corriere Adriatico based in Ancona.

Since 2000 all publishing and new media have been clustered in the Caltagirone Editore publishing group – the fifth biggest group in Italy. In 2006 he acquired the majority stake in the newspaper Il Gazzettino based in Venice.

Francesco Gaetano Caltagirone is a member of the Executive Committee of Confindustria and the Committee of the President of the Italian Federation of Newspaper Publishers, and he is a director of the Auditorium Parco della Musica of Rome.

In 2006 he was appointed a Knight of the Order of Merit for Labour. In the same year he became vice-president of Banca Monte dei Paschi di Siena. Until early 2012, when he liquidated his share completely, he was the second largest shareholder and the most important private individual shareholder. In 2007 he was appointed Director of Assicurazioni Generali S.p.A., of which he was appointed Vice President in April 2010.

He is married to Luisa Farinon (the sister of former TV presenter Gabriella) and has three children: Francesco Jr., Alessandro and Azzurra, the wife of the Italian politician Pier Ferdinando Casini.

Most important subsidiaries
 Caltagirone S.p.A.
 Cementir S.p.A.
 Caltagirone Editore S.p.A.
 Vianini Lavori S.p.A.
 Vianini Industria S.p.A.

Other important participations
 Assicurazioni Generali S.p.A.
 Unicredit S.p.A.
 Acea S.p.A.
 Grandi Stazioni S.p.A. (through Eurostazioni S.p.A.)

Honors and awards
 : Knight of the Order of Merit for Labour 1 June 2006

References

1943 births
Living people
Businesspeople from Rome
Italian billionaires
Italian newspaper publishers (people)